Batom Reachea (born Ang Non; 1616–1642) was King of Cambodia from 1640 to 1642.

Ang Non was the eldest son of the uprayorach (ឧភយោរាជ, "Great Joint King") Outey. Ang Non married Princess Ang Na Kshatriyi, who was the daughter of King Chey Chettha II and his Vietnamese spouse Neak Ang Chov (Nguyễn Phúc Ngọc Vạn).

King Ang Tong Reachea died in 1640. Although Ponhea Chan should be the next king, Outey forced Chan to give the crown to Ang Non. Chan was dissatisfied. With the help of Cham and Malay mercenaries, Chan assassinated Outey on 5 January 1642. In the same time Batom Reachea was away on a hunting trip. Chan captured him and had him executed in Oudong.

References

 Chroniques Royales du Cambodge de 1594 à 1677. École française d'Extrême Orient. Paris 1981 
 Achille Dauphin-Meunier  Histoire du Cambodge Presses universitaires de France, Paris 1968 Que sais-je ? n° 916.

1616 births
1642 deaths
17th-century Cambodian monarchs